Bandon Marsh National Wildlife Refuge is a U.S. National Wildlife Refuge on Oregon's coast. It is one of six National Wildlife Refuges comprising the Oregon Coast National Wildlife Refuge Complex and is renowned among bird watchers for being able to view rare shorebirds including ruff, Hudsonian godwit, and Mongolian plover.
The refuge was last expanded in 1999, it now has  in two units:  Bandon Marsh and Ni-les'tun.

Recreation

Bandon Marsh is popular for hunting, fishing, clamming, birding and photography. The wildlife refuge protects the largest tidal salt marsh in the Coquille River estuary. The mudflats are rich in clam, crab, worm, and shrimp and attracts migrating shorebirds, waterfowl, coho salmon, as well as the  California brown pelican.
More common shorebird species include western and least sandpiper, semipalmated plover, black-bellied plover, Pacific golden plover, red phalarope, whimbrel, dunlin.

The Ni-Les'tun Unit
The Ni-les'tun unit is a habitat restoration project which will eventually benefit fish and wildlife.  In consists of intertidal and freshwater marsh, and riparian land.  It also protects a 4,500-year-old Native American archaeological site of the  Coquille Indian Tribe. The Refuge is planning a marsh restoration for this unit where an influx of saltwater and freshwater will allow a revival of mudflats and marsh plants, and interconnecting tidal channels will bisect the wildlife habitat south of the overlook deck. As the land returns to a functioning intertidal marsh, flocks of seasonally driven migratory birds and young fish will use the restored habitat.

There are several overlooks, as well as access for hunters, birders, fishermen, and clammers.  State and federal regulations are in effect. The Marsh is located just north of Bandon, on the north side of the Coquille River across from Bullards Beach State Park.

See also 

 List of National Wildlife Refuges
 Natural environment
 Nature

Notes

External links 
 

Protected areas of Coos County, Oregon
National Wildlife Refuges in Oregon
Marshes of Oregon
Landforms of Coos County, Oregon